sec-Butylamine is an organic chemical compound (specifically, an amine) with the formula CH3CH2CH(NH2)CH3.  It is a colorless liquid.  sec-Butylamine is one of the four isomeric amines of butane, the others being n-butylamine, tert-butylamine, and isobutylamine.  sec-Butylamine is chiral and therefore can exist in either of two enantiomeric forms.

sec-Butylamine is used in the production of some pesticides.

Safety
The LD50 (rat) for primary alkylamines is 100 – 1 mg/kg.

References

Alkylamines